The 2013–14 Super League Greece was the 78th season of the highest football league of Greece and the eighth under the name Super League. The season began on 17 August and ended in May 2014. Olympiacos are the champions, having won their 41st Greek championship.

The league comprises fourteen teams from the 2012–13 season and four promoted teams from the 2012–13 Football League.

Teams
Two teams were relegated at the end of the 2012–13 season. AEK Athens and Kerkyra were already mathematically assured of relegation to the 2013–14 Football League. Kerkyra finished 3 years of spell in the top level while AEK faced first relegation to second division after 89 years.

Four teams were promoted from the 2012–13 Football League, champions Apollon Smyrnis, runners-up Ergotelis, third placed AEL Kalloni and Panetolikos, the winners of a four-team play-off round. Apollon returned to top level 13 years after relegation, Ergotelis made their immediate come back, while Kalloni made their debut in it. Panetolikos also made their immediate come back.

Stadiums and locations

Personnel and kits

Note: Flags indicate national team as has been defined under FIFA eligibility rules. Players and Managers may hold more than one non-FIFA nationality.

Managerial changes

Regular season

League table

Results

Positions by round
The table lists the positions of teams after each week of matches. In order to preserve chronological evolvements, any postponed matches are not included in the round at which they were originally scheduled, but added to the full round they were played immediately afterwards.

Play-offs
In the play-off for Champions League, the four qualified teams play each other in a home and away round robin. However, they do not all start with 0 points. Instead, a weighting system applies to the teams' standing at the start of the play-off mini-league. The team finishing fifth in the Super League will start the play-off with 0 points. The fifth placed team's end of season tally of points is subtracted from the sum of the points that other teams have. This number is then divided by five.  PAOK then suffered a penalty of three points because of a riot at a cup game with Olympiakos.

Play-off Match
The game took place in Kleanthis Vikelidis Stadium on 11 June 2014.

Skoda Xanthi retained their spot in 2014–15 Super League; Olympiacos Volos remained in 2014–15 Football League.

Season statistics
Updated to games played on 13 April 2014.

Top scorers

Top assists

Awards

Annual awards
Annual awards were announced on 3 February 2015.

Player of the Year  
The Player of the Year awarded to  Marcus Berg (Panathinaikos)

Foreign Player of the Year 
The Foreign Player of the Year awarded to   Marcus Berg (Panathinaikos)

Top goalscorer of the Year 
The Top goalscorer of the Year awarded to   Esteban Solari (Xanthi)

Greek Player of the Year  
The Greek Player of the Year awarded to  Dimitris Papadopoulos (Atromitos)

Manager of the Year  
The Manager of the Year awarded to  Giannis Anastasiou (Panathinaikos)

Young Player of the Year  
The Young Player of the Year awarded to  Dimitris Kolovos (Panionios)

Team of the Year 

Goalkeeper:
 Roberto Jimenez (Olympiacos)
Defence:
 Rodrigo Galo (Panetolikos),  Nikolaos Lazaridis (Atromitos),  Stathis Tavlaridis (Atromitos),  Nano (Panathinaikos)
Midfield:
 Joel Campbell (Olympiacos),  Fernando Usero (Asteras Tripolis),  Javier Umbides (Atromitos),  Alejandro Domínguez (Olympiacos)
Attack:
 Dimitris Papadopoulos (Atromitos),   Marcus Berg (Panathinaikos)

Tickets
Updated to games played on 13 April 2014, As published to superleaguegreece.net. Games were counted without games played behind closed gates, so for example Olympiacos played 17 home games, but had one game behind closed gates, making 16 games.

References

External links
Official website 

Gre
1
2013-14